The 1979 Tennessee Volunteers football team (variously "Tennessee", "UT" or the "Vols") represented the University of Tennessee in the 1979 NCAA Division I-A football season. Playing as a member of the Southeastern Conference (SEC), the team was led by head coach Johnny Majors, in his third year, and played their home games at Neyland Stadium in Knoxville, Tennessee. They finished the season with a record of seven wins and five losses (7–5 overall, 3–3 in the SEC) and a loss against Purdue in the Astro-Bluebonnet Bowl.

Schedule

Personnel

Season summary

at Kentucky

Vanderbilt

Jimmy Streater became school's all-time leading passer

Bluebonnet Bowl (vs. Purdue)

Team players drafted into the NFL

Reference:

References

Tennessee
Tennessee Volunteers football seasons
Tennessee Volunteers football